Joseph O'Reilly may refer to: 

Joe O'Reilly (born 1955), Irish politician
Joe O'Reilly (footballer), Irish athlete

See also
Joseph Reilly (disambiguation)
Joseph Riley (disambiguation)